Depths is the debut studio album by American deathcore band Oceano, released April 7, 2009 through Earache Records. Music videos were made for the songs "District of Misery" and "A Mandatory Sacrifice". The song "District of Misery" is featured as downloadable content in Rock Band 2 via the Rock Band Network

Track listing

Personnel
Oceano
 Adam Warren - vocals
 Jeremy Carroll - guitars
 Andrew Mikhail - guitars
 Jason Jones - bass
 Daniel Terchin - drums

Production
 Joey Sturgis - producer, keyboards, programming, mastering, mixing, engineer

References

 

2009 debut albums
Earache Records albums
Albums produced by Joey Sturgis
Oceano (band) albums